The Grand Prix Général Patton is a junior (ages 17–18) road cycling race held annually in Luxembourg. It was part of the UCI Junior Nations' Cup between 2008 and 2019. Until 2019, the race was held as a stage race before being shortened to one day.

Winners

References

Cycle races in Luxembourg
Recurring sporting events established in 1965
1947 establishments in Luxembourg